George Davis (March 1, 1820 – February 23, 1896) was a Confederate politician and railroad counsel who served as attorney general of the Confederate States for 480 days in 1864 and 1865.

A skilled orator, he gave a notable public speech in March 1861 in which he argued that North Carolina should secede from the United States of America to protect the private economic interest in chattel slavery.

Biography

Early years
George Davis was born on his father's slave operated plantation at Porters Neck, near Wilmington, North Carolina. He attended the University of North Carolina and was valedictorian of its Class of 1838. He studied law and was admitted to the bar in 1840.

In 1848, he became general counsel of the Wilmington and Weldon Railroad, a highly remunerative position that he held until the end of his life.

1861 Peace Conference delegate
Davis began his political career as a Whig. The party collapsed in 1856. With other Southern former Whigs who wanted to avoid secession over the slavery issue and refused to join either the Republican Party or the Democratic Party, he backed the Constitutional Union Party in the Election of 1860.

Following the election of Abraham Lincoln, Davis served as a delegate from North Carolina to the Washington Peace Conference of February 4–27, 1861.

Davis reacted badly to constitutional amendment proposals that would have preserved slavery where it existed but prohibited slavery in any territory of the United States "now held, or hereafter acquired" north of the latitude 36 degrees, 30 minutes line.

He returned to Wilmington a secessionist.

Secession to save slavery
On March 2, 1861 — just days after returning to Wilmington from the peace conference — Davis made a public speech in which he spoke of North Carolina's requirement of "property in slaves."

He made clear publicly that he was a secessionist. Secession, he said, was required to protect the economic interests of North Carolina's slaveowners and all others in the state economically intertwined with the institution of slavery:
We could never accept the plan adopted by the Convention as consistent with the rights, the interests, or the dignity of North Carolina ... The division must be made on the line of slavery. The state must go with the South.

Pro-slavery North Carolina elites declared secession from the Union on May 20, 1861. The state's formal involvement with the confederate government began. Soon after, North Carolina secessionists placed Davis on a slate from which he was chosen a delegate to the Provisional Confederate Congress for 1861-1862. Later, Davis was elected to a two-year term in the Senate.

Confederate senator and attorney general
On September 27, 1863, Davis's wife, Mary Adelaide Polk Davis (of the politically prominent Polk Family, of which former President Polk had been a member) died in Wilmington, aged 43. Later that autumn, the North Carolina General Assembly elected William Alexander Graham to the Senate seat held by Davis.

To keep George Davis in the foundering government, Confederate President Jefferson Davis (no known relation) in January 1864 appointed him as Attorney General ahead of the senate term ending on February 17, 1864.

George Davis resigned the senate and then held the cabinet post from January 2, 1864. The duties of Confederate attorney general did not involve any part of military affairs. And, as the Confederate Supreme Court was never created, there was little for the attorney general to do other than attend cabinet deliberations and to draft legal guidance for other cabinet members based on the thin book of Confederate statutes. Davis served in the post until his resignation soon after the Fall of Richmond in April 1865.

Offers of public service were made to him before and after the war, but he refused them all. George Davis never held any public office under the flag of the United States of America.

Fugitive and prisoner
As the Confederacy collapsed, George Davis accompanied the fugitive government as far as Charlotte, North Carolina. He submitted a resignation on April 25, 1865, and received notice of its acceptance the next day. He had served as attorney general for 68 weeks and three days.

Davis then, traveling alone, attempted to flee to England by way of Florida and Nassau. As he planned to leave the United States, he chose to let his motherless children remain with extended family.

Davis was captured by United States forces at Key West, Florida, on October 18, 1865.
He was imprisoned at Fort Hamilton in Brooklyn, New York until being given his parole by President Johnson on January 2, 1866.

Private life and death
Davis accepted an appointment as a delegate to the 1866 National Union Convention. The private convention, ultimately unsuccessful, was an attempt to build a new political party to support President Andrew Johnson and his personal policies of white supremacy and administrative vandalism of Congress's program of Reconstruction.

Davis returned to Wilmington. He rebuilt his law practice and worked as a railroad counsel. Davis married Monimia Fairfax, 17 years his junior and a member of Virginia's elite and powerful Fairfax and Randolph families.

In 1878, Governor Zebulon Baird Vance offered Davis the chief justiceship of the state supreme court, but Davis turned it down on the grounds that he could not live on the salary.

He gave his last public speech in 1889, at a memorial event in Wilmington for Jefferson Davis. In the speech, George Davis summarized his own political career in a sentence:

My ambition went down with the banner of the South, and, like it, never rose again.

He died in 1896, aged 75.

Memorials

Lost Cause encomiums
After his death, white Wilmington elites and leaders of the state's legal profession began to lionize Davis as an example of perfect white Southern manhood.

Despite Davis's real history as a pro-Union Whig and as a footnote figure in the American Civil War, Lost Cause fabulists created a fictional, revisionist image of Davis as an ideal statesman.

For example, during a speech upon the presentation of his portrait to the Supreme Court of North Carolina in the autumn of 1915, Lost Cause pamphleteer Samuel A'Court Ashe described Davis as a man without a single character fault or sin — even extending his over-the-top praise to Davis' handwriting:
Indeed, his very handwriting was an index of that characteristic, every letter being perfectly formed, and his writing without blemish.

Monument

In 1911, a Confederate monument to Davis was dedicated in downtown Wilmington, North Carolina, by the United Daughters of the Confederacy — 46 years after the Confederacy's surrender.

The monument shows Davis, hand on lectern, giving a speech. Its stone base includes a spurious encomium to Davis's supposed virtue, not dissimilar from the Lost Cause memorial speeches given about him during the era.

Historians have stated that similar monuments are evidence of a wide effort by the UDC and others, long after the failure of the Confederacy, to insert the false Lost Cause Narrative into the cultural memory, announce to nonwhites the final defeat of Reconstruction, and to support white supremacy.

On June 25, 2020, the statue, but not its pedestal, was temporarily removed by the City of Wilmington coincident with the firing of three police officers the city said had participated in "brutally racist" discussions recorded on official police equipment. To justify the dismantling, the city government cited the public safety exception within the state law intended to frustrate the removal of confederate monuments in North Carolina. The city did not announce a place of storage or a date for re-erection.

On August 2, 2021, the City Council approved an agreement with Cape Fear 3, United Daughters of the Confederacy to permanently remove the monument from public land.

Grave marker
After his death in 1896, his remains were buried in Wilmington's Oakdale Cemetery under a flat stone marker that bears a Celtic cross.

The marker includes the revisionist Lost Cause inscription —
Statesman, yet friend to truth of soul sincere In action faithful and in honor, dear
— and an edited quotation of Psalm 15.

Highway historical marker
In 1949, the North Carolina state government placed a highway historical marker regarding Davis on US Highway 17 at Porters Neck Road near Wilmington.:

GEORGE DAVIS 1820-1896
Served the Confederacy as a senator, 1862-64, & as the attorney general, 1864-65. His birthplace was three miles east.

Liberty ship
 It was scrapped in 1960.

Portrait
During the court's Fall Term of 1915, his family presented a portrait of George Davis to hang in the library of the Supreme Court of North Carolina. All other portraits in the court's collection are of justices of the court.

Sons of Confederate Veterans Unit
A unit of the Sons of Confederate Veterans was named "George Davis Camp 5."

References

Further reading

External links
 

1820 births
1896 deaths
American proslavery activists
19th-century American politicians
Burials at Oakdale Cemetery
Executive members of the Cabinet of the Confederate States of America
Confederate States of America senators
Deputies and delegates to the Provisional Congress of the Confederate States
North Carolina lawyers
People of North Carolina in the American Civil War
Politicians from Wilmington, North Carolina
University of North Carolina at Chapel Hill alumni